The Lee L-1P-S "Little Mixer" is a single place parasol homebuilt aircraft designed and built in the 1950s.

Development
The "Little Mixer" is a modification of a homebuilt design and fuselage first constructed by Jim McManiman of Eugene, Oregon in 1930. The airframe was licensed under Oregon state rules, and predated McManiman's later design, the McManiman “Baby Fleet”.

Design
The Little Mixer is a high wing open cockpit parasol with a fabric covered steel tube fuselage. The cowling and landing gear are from a Piper J-3 model. The wings are all-wood with fabric covering.

Specifications (Lee L-1P-S "Little Mixer")

See also

Notes

References

Homebuilt aircraft
Articles containing video clips